Far Rockaway is the terminus of the Long Island Rail Road's Far Rockaway Branch in the Far Rockaway neighborhood of Queens in New York City. The station is located at Nameoke Avenue (formerly Nameoke Street) and Redfern Avenue.

History
Far Rockaway station was originally built by the South Side Railroad of Long Island on July 29, 1869. From 1872 to 1877, the station was located in close proximity to the southern terminus of the LIRR's Cedarhurst Cut-off. The original station house was converted into a freight house, and replaced by the 2nd station which was moved from Ocean Point Station (a.k.a. Cedarhurst Station), remodeled, and opened on October 1, 1881. The 3rd depot opened on July 15, 1890, while the 2nd depot was sold and moved to a private location in October 1890. From 1897 to 1926 the Ocean Electric Railway used Far Rockaway station as both the eastern terminus and as their headquarters. It also served as the terminus of a Long Island Electric Railway trolley line leading to Jamaica. The tracks and platforms were elevated as with much of the Far Rockaway Branch on April 10, 1942.

The Far Rockaway Branch had originally been part of a loop that traveled along the existing route, continuing through the Rockaway Peninsula and heading on a trestle across Jamaica Bay through Queens where it reconnected with the Atlantic and Lower Montauk branches, and even the Main Line. Frequent fires and maintenance problems led to the LIRR abandoning the Queens portion of the route (with the exception being this station), which was acquired by the city to become the IND Rockaway Line, with service provided by the A train. The line was divided with the portions from Mott Avenue becoming part of the subway system on January 16, 1958, and the current Far Rockaway station becoming not only the terminus of the LIRR branch on February 21, 1958, but also the newest station on the branch.

Although the station is located within New York City, it is not part of LIRR's CityTicket program—which provides discounted tickets for LIRR and Metro-North Railroad trips entirely within the city—as the line passes through Nassau County. Residents and politicians have asked the MTA to include the station in the program. The MTA has stated that they are concerned about customers from other stations along the line in Nassau boarding trains at the reduced CityTicket rate. As of March 2022, the MTA is investigating a way to provide some form of benefit or incentive to make up for the lack of CityTicket.

Station layout
This station has one 10-car-long island platform. North of the station, the two tracks merge, then split into four tracks––two of which are used for storage and two continue on towards Jamaica. The station house dating to 1958 was demolished in 2020.

References

External links 

Old Far Rockaway Station (c. 1905) and "FW" Tower (1907) (Arrt's Arrchives)
Far Rockaway Station photos; 1915-1957 (TrainsAreFun)
 Station House from Google Maps Street View
 Platform from Google Maps Street View

Long Island Rail Road stations in New York City
Transportation in Rockaway, Queens
Railway stations in the United States opened in 1958
Railway stations in Queens, New York
1958 establishments in New York City